bwin Interactive Entertainment AG, formerly known as Betandwin, is an Austrian online betting brand acquired by Entain PLC. The group operated under international and regional licences in countries like Gibraltar, the Amerindian reserve of Kahnawake (Canada), and Belize; and Germany, Italy, Mexico, Croatia, Austria, France, and the United Kingdom in Europe. Bwin offered sports betting, poker, casino games, and soft and skill games, with most revenue coming from poker and sports betting. bwin had over 20 million registered customers in more than 25 core markets. Competence centres were located in Vienna, Stockholm, and Gibraltar.

The company provided services for its subsidiaries such as marketing, finance, and administration, corporate communications, controlling, and IT services. All operational activities were managed by licensed subsidiaries. It was listed on the Vienna Stock Exchange from March 2000 until the company's merger with PartyGaming plc in March 2011, forming Bwin.Party Digital Entertainment. That company was purchased by GVC Holdings in February 2016; GVC continues to use bwin as a brand.

History 
Beginning with 12 employees in its founding in 1997, bwin was formerly known as "betandwin" until 2006. The company launched its first online gambling site in 1998, focusing on the growing sports betting market. One of the most important developments in the company's history was the launch of its live betting product, developed in-house, allowing players to place bets on sporting events while the actual event was taking place. The firm's initial public offering at the Austrian Stock Exchange took place in March 2000.

Betandwin acquired Simon Bold (Gibraltar) in June 2001 and changed its name to bwin International Ltd. This relocation to Gibraltar was done to keep up with the company's main competitors, who had already moved to the British Overseas Territory. 

By December 2001, betandwin was ready to step into the online casino gaming market and did so by launching its first casino platform. Two years later, in July 2003, betandwin introduced and launched a soft games platform known as "Balls of Fire." 

In November 2004, betandwin launched multiplayer poker. In June 2005, the group acquired betoto.com, a company which offers a fixed-odds betting service to punters around the globe, in an effort to expand its presence in the Greek market. 

In December 2005, betandwin acquired Ongame e-Solutions AB, a move consistent with the group’s strategy to expand into the poker market. After the takeover, Ongame e-Solutions changed its name to bwin Games. In 2005, betandwin acquired global media rights outside of Germany to the Germany Football League. 

In August 2006, betandwin launched the new bwin brand. This was done after it was found that the betandwin brand, which was described as "descriptive, high-grade and functional," was not suited anymore for the wide assortment of entertainment offerings covered by the company, including sports betting, poker, soft games, and casino games. 

In 2007, bwin began to offer live streaming of major sports events.

In September 2009, bwin announced the acquisition of Italian poker operator Gioco Digitale, marking the company's entry into the Italian online gambling market.

Bwin is often confused with BetWinner, but they are different bookmakers, with individual features and advantages.

PartyGaming merger
On April 1, 2011, bwin and British gaming firm PartyGaming announced their merger. The new company bwin.party became the world's largest publicly traded online gaming firm, 48.4% of which was owned by existing PartyGaming shareholders and 51.6% by bwin shareholders. The merged company was listed on the London Stock Exchange, with joint CEO's Norbert Teufelberger and Jim Ryan. After a takeover of bwin.party by British GVC Group, the brand bwin continues to exist as customer brand in its portfolio.

Products 
The company's subsidiaries and affiliated companies offer sports betting, poker, casino games, and soft games, as well as audio and video streams on sporting events, such as the German Bundesliga. These are all provided via the Internet, and many are also available via other digital distribution channels, such as mobile phone.

Sports Betting 
Sports bets are the core business at bwin. Today, the sports betting line-up includes more than 90 different sports; the core area of customer interest is soccer. Other sports include all popular ball-related sports, US sports, as well as all major winter sports and motorsports ranging from Formula 1 to MotoGP. "Exotic" sports such as Roller Hockey, Futsal, and Darts are also included in the daily line-up. Customers can also find odds on a range of events outside the area of sports. These include bets on politics and entertainment, such as the Oscars, Talent Shows, the Eurovision Song Contest, and "Miss" events.

Poker 
The following types of games are offered at bwin Poker: Texas Hold’em, Omaha, Omaha Hi/Lo, Seven Card Stud, Seven Card Stud Hi/Lo, and Five-card draw. In terms of stakes, users can choose between Fixed Limit, Pot Limit, or No Limit tables. A "play money" version of the games is also available for users to try for free. bwin offers poker tournaments, including Sit & Go, scheduled, and cash games (ring games). Sit & Go tournaments begin as soon as the table is completely occupied. Scheduled tournaments begin at a specified time and allow for a higher numbers of participants and the highest prize pools. In cash games the players can join and leave at-will. bwin Poker can be played using the Mac OS X Poker Client, the Windows Poker Client, the Java Poker Client, or the Mobile Poker Client. The Mac and Windows versions offer an extensive selection of features such as statistics and a mini-table function. The Java client is platform-agnostic and browser-based. The mobile client allows customers to play cash games on their mobile phones.

Casino Games 
bwin offers more than 1000+ games, ranging from classics such as roulette or blackjack to slot machines and casino tournaments. The casino has a longstanding tradition at bwin, but in 2001, it was introduced as a second product, in addition to sports betting.

Soft Games 
bwin offers more than 60 games divided into the categories of Fortune Games, Skill Games, Mini Games and "ParaDice," as well as Backgammon. This is the product group with the biggest potential for innovation and expansion in the market.

bwin Games AB
bwin Games AB — founded in 1999 and formerly known as Ongame e-solutions AB — became part of the bwin Group following its acquisition, in March 2006, by bwin Interactive Entertainment AG.

Within the bwin Group, bwin Games AB acts as the competence centre for poker and casino games, developing products via digital distribution channels for bwin proprietarily owned brands, such as PokerRoom.com, HoldemPoker.com, eCardroom.com, PokerGaming.com, Europoker.com, and the Ongame Network partners.

PokerRoom.com
PokerRoom.com was an online poker cardroom founded in 1999. Licensed by the Kahnawake Gaming Commission, PokerRoom offered both play and real money formats. Tournaments and ring games were available in both web-browser and download client platforms, with support for both Macintosh and Linux. PokerRoom was one of the first online poker sites to provide multi-language support, and catered to Danish, German, Spanish, French, Italian, Russian, and Swedish speakers. These languages were accessed via "regional sites," many of them showing local sponsorships for the selected region.

Legal Issues 
PokerRoom also maintains a play money only site, PokerRoom.tv, that is advertised in Canada on the boards of National Hockey League rinks, as well as on U.S. television networks like ABC.

Awards 
PokerRoom has won industry awards, such as "Poker Site of the Year" from the UK Gambling Awards in 2006 and "Top Poker Software" from the Online Gambling Magazine Awards in 2005.

Shutdown 
After 10 years of operation, bwin announced the closure of PokerRoom.com on April 14, 2009. Players with money still left in their accounts were encouraged to transfer their balance and play at bwin.com. However, PokerRoom.com players with large "play money" accounts had to abandon those accounts when transferring to bwin.com.

Legal Status 
As the global legal framework for Internet gambling is a complicated mix of laws and regulations, bwin's situation varies depending on the country concerned. For several years now, the United Kingdom and Italy have been examples of countries that have regulated their online gaming markets to the advantage of all stakeholders. Just recently, Italy extended its online licenses to include poker tournaments, and countries like France, Spain, and Denmark announced their intention to permit private operators access to their markets under stringent conditions and controls. Other countries, on the other hand, are still pursuing a policy of maintaining a state monopoly of internet gaming, or even a complete ban.

On 15 September 2006, Norbert Teufelberger and Manfred Bodner were arrested at a press conference in La Turbie, France, due to offenses against the French gambling laws. After an investigation the judge released them on the evening of September 18, 2006.

Due to the enactment of the Safe Port Act, bwin stopped taking bets from United States-based players in October 2006. The offerings became available again upon regulation of the markets. In the States where regulation is in place, the same product line offered through bwin is available through BetMGM, the joint venture of bwin's parent company Entain PLC's with MGM Resorts International.

On 6 March 2007, the European Court of Justice struck down Italian national gambling restrictions in the Placanica case.

The EFTA Court held hearings in January 2007 to decide on the admissibility of a state monopoly for betting and gaming according to European Law. The decision of the EFTA Court will be made on 14 March 2007.

In February 2021, bwin ended its operations in Russia. An agreement was made with Parimatch enabling customers to transfer platforms along with their funds.

Sponsorship 
bwin sponsored football giant Real Madrid from 2007 to 2013 and they were also a premium partner of FC Bayern Munich. In October 2010, bwin announced a sponsorship for the upcoming three football seasons in which they would be the title sponsor of the Portuguese League Cup (renamed the "bwin Cup"). In July 2010, bwin signed a two-year sponsorship deal with Italy's second tier, Serie B. Additionally, bwin cooperates with the International Basketball Association (FIBA) and has been sponsoring the European and World Basketball Championships since 2006. In the area of motorsport, the company is one of the main sponsors of the MotoGP series. In 2010, bwin became the title sponsor of the races in Jerez and Estoril and official partner of the GP in Brno, Misano, Mugello. In the past, many other popular events across international and local sports were supported by bwin. bwin also lent its name to the Primeira Liga (bwinLIGA), sponsored Italian football club Milan from 2006 to 2010, and has also been a partner to popular football clubs, such as Real Madrid, Juventus and Werder Bremen.

In addition, bwin organised numerous online and offline poker events. One of the biggest regular online poker tournaments was the ChampionChip. Special poker tournaments, like the Weekly Country Showdown or the bwin Dailies, offered a huge range of tournaments adjusted to specific country regulations and buy-in levels. Periodically new types and variations of Sit & Go tournaments were launched. Through several online qualifying events, a bwin user could qualify for offline events like the World Series of Poker (WSOP), the Aussie Millions, and events on the World Poker Tour. For "poker newbies," bwin offered a special route - the Rookie Challenge, where a new poker player had the chance to climb up several stages for free to earn real money tickets.

In 2008, bwin provided the luxury villa on bwin PokerIsland as filming location for the music video of Lady Gaga's hit Poker Face. The video featured bwin branded poker equipment through a product placement campaign.

The company faced some opposition in Europe over its sponsorship of sports, especially football. In 2006, Bremen banned its top football team, Sportverein Werder Bremen, from carrying the bwin logo on its shirts. In November 2009, the city acted further by moving against sport stores which sold shirts from other teams, such as Milan and Real Madrid.

In 2017, bwin signed a three-year partnership with Italian football club Inter Milan becoming its first official betting partner.

In 2019, bwin became Valencia CF's main global sponsor. The three-year agreement was made official in July 2019. As of 2020 the agreement is in jeopardy with the Spanish government informing all La Liga clubs that betting sponsors will be banned from the start of the 2021-22 season.

In 2020, bwin announced a three-year partnership with the Belgian Pro League becoming the official sports betting partner of Belgium's top tier football division. The deal will also cover the Belgian First Division B and Belgian Super Cup. bwin is able to broadcast live coverage of football matches to customers using both online and mobile platforms as part of the agreement.

In April 2021, bwin signed a five-year partnership with Liga Portugal. As part of the deal, the Primeira Liga, Portugal's top football division, will be called Liga Portugal Bwin from July 2021 onward.

In August 2021, bwin signed extended deals with German Bundesliga football clubs Borussia Dortmund, Union Berlin, and FC Köln, as well as 2. Bundesliga clubs FC St. Pauli and Dynamo Dresden. As part of the deal, bwin will serve as the exclusive sports betting provider for each team. Each of the agreements will run from the 2021-22 season until the end of the 2023-24 season.

In September 2021, bwin signed a partnership with UEFA to become an Official Partner of the UEFA Europa League and the UEFA Europa Conference League for the 2021-24 seasons.

Responsible Gaming
A dedicated Corporate Social Responsibility department of the company was in charge of social responsibility. Protection of minors, protection against manipulation of bets, and the prevention of gaming addiction were key aspects of the bwin CSRphilosophy. bwin supported research in this field in a joint project with Harvard Medical School. bwin is a co-founder of the EGBA (European Gaming and Betting Association), where it lobbied for fair competition within a regulated online gaming market. As founder and member of the ESSA (European Sports Security Association), bwin campaigned against manipulation and fraud in the fields of sports and betting.

Awards 
At the annual EGR Awards organised by eGaming Review magazine, bwin won the "Operator of the Year 2009" award.

References

External links
 

Entain
2011 disestablishments in Austria
Online gambling companies of Austria
1997 establishments in Austria